Jiangfang Township is a rural township in Wutai County, Shanxi, China. The township nestles snugly at the foot of Mount Wutai. It is located in the south of Wutai County. It is surrounded by Lingjing Township on the north, Doucun Town on the west, Geng Town on the east, and Rucun Township on the south.

Administrative division
As of 2015, the township is divided into 22 villages: Jiangfang, Siyang, Xiaonanpo, Xixia, Dongxia, Xiakou, Tianjing, Shibei, Xiufeng, Songlin, Weimozhuang, Dayukou, Xujiazhuang, Gusi, Wangyan, Pailouyan, Tiantang, Taobogou, Poposi, Nan'angou, Wacha and Dianjun.

Transport
The Provincial Highway S310 passes across the township.

Tourist attractions
The Wenbi Pagoda was built in the Qing dynasty (1644–1911). The base of the pagoda is round and built with natural stone.

References

Jiangfang